Khatra is last studio album by Nepalese rapper Yama Buddha. Khatra album is collections of thing that are happening/happened in Nepal. All of the songs were recorded in London and was produced by Nasty (Abhishek Baniya) from TEC records.

Track listing 

 Taaj - Taaj (English:Fresh) this song describes about he doesn't care about anyone
 Paisa - Paisa (English:Money) this song describes about how people need money

Personnel 
 Yama Buddha - Singer
 Nasty (Abhishek Baniya) - Producer (exec.)

References 

2017 albums
Yama Buddha albums